Cuba City Jail is a historic jail located at Cuba, Crawford County, Missouri. It was built in 1908, and is a one-story, rectangular-shaped, concrete block jail structure. It consists of a primary guard space complete with desk and wood-burning stove and a rear cell room with pair of hanging iron bunks. The structure was in use until 1954 and today serves as a museum.

It was listed on the National Register of Historic Places in 2014.

References

History museums in Missouri
Government buildings on the National Register of Historic Places in Missouri
Government buildings completed in 1908
Buildings and structures in Crawford County, Missouri
National Register of Historic Places in Crawford County, Missouri